Juan José Moral Arnaiz (born 20 August 1951) is a Spanish former racing cyclist.

He was a delegate for Spain at the 1976 Summer Olympics in Montréal, Canada, where he finished in 33rd place in the individual road race. He won the Spanish national road cycling championship for under 23 in 1971. He participated in the World Cycling Championships in 1974 and 1975. In 1975, representing the Spanish national team, he won the second stage in the Peace Race (Course the la Paix)in Germany, being the first Spanish doing it. In 1976, he finished third in the national road cycling championship and won the national time trial title. He finished second in the Tour of Ireland that year (behind Sean Kelly) and fourth in the Tour de Suisse.

References

1951 births
Living people
Spanish male cyclists
Cyclists at the 1976 Summer Olympics
Olympic cyclists of Spain
Sportspeople from Gipuzkoa
Cyclists from the Basque Country (autonomous community)